Bushey is a railway station in Hertfordshire which serves Bushey and Oxhey. North of the station, the railway crosses the Colne valley on several viaducts.

The station is served by London Northwestern Railway semi-fast trains on the West Coast main line, and by London Overground services on the Watford DC line, a slow local service along the West Coast route. At Bushey, this branches west on a loop to serve Watford High Street railway station, before rejoining the main line at Watford Junction.

History

The London and Birmingham Railway first ran through here on 20 July 1837. A station was not initially provided, as the area was then sparsely populated.

A station was provided later in a similar red brick style to others along the route, larger than most although smaller than that at Harrow & Wealdstone. London Underground's Bakerloo line trains served the station from 16 April 1917 until 24 September 1982.

During the war years of 1939-1945 the station was often known as "Ampersand" - this was due to a typically bureaucratic application of emergency regulations. To hinder enemy troops in the event of an invasion it was ordered that all station names should be painted out on station name-boards, and this was interpreted at Bushey & Oxhey to mean the words 'Bushey' and 'Oxhey' but not the '&'. For the duration of the war, therefore, the station bore the designation '&'. Also during wartime a concrete pillbox (a small gun fortification) was provided under the viaduct, between platforms 2 and 3.

Even so, it was late in the 1980s before signage at the station reflected this change.

Notable Incidents

On 16 February 1980, faulty trackwork caused nine coaches of an express London Euston to Manchester Piccadilly passenger train to derail as it passed through the station. Three coaches were overturned and 19 passengers were seriously injured. The track required extensive repairs and did not reopen fully until 25 February 1980. The little used platform 3 was extensively damaged in the accident and remained closed until 2011.

On 20 April 1980, a passenger train heading for  derailed immediately before Bushey station after hitting track maintenance machinery. The leading bogie of the Class 310 EMU derailed, but the train remained upright and damage was slight. One member of the track maintenance team sustained a broken pelvis.

Design

The local London Overground DC service that loops to the west to serve Watford High Street before Watford Junction makes platforms 1 & 2 curve away from the main line route. There are four main line platforms: one for the down (northbound) fast line (platform 3), two for the up (southbound) fast and the down (northbound) slow lines (platforms 4 & 5) which form an island platform; one serving the up (southbound) slow line (platform 6). 

Platforms 3 and 4 are by far the least used, since these fast main line tracks are normally used by trains not stopping at Bushey. Platform 3 is accessed via the stairway for platform 2 and is fitted with a remotely operated gate to prevent access when the platform is not in operation. Platforms 3 and 4 were brought back into use for the December 2011 timetable, which marks some services as "front four coaches only for Bushey", allowing an improved late evening and weekend connection with London. Prior to this reinstatement, engineering works frequently meant that late-evening London Midland services could not stop at Bushey as a northbound platform was not available. It was overgrown after having fallen into disuse many years earlier and boarded off following its partial destruction during the crash of February 1980: the locomotive and leading two coaches passed through the station before coming to a stand having destroyed the platform face.

Between 2000 and 2007, a storage yard and redundant buildings were converted into a high-voltage substation to supply the significantly higher current required for the new, higher speed, Pendolino express trains.

Station Improvements

Starting in December 2007, Transport for London began a significant upgrade programme at the station. During the following four years, the underpass was relined with plasterboard walls and corrugated steel ceilings and repainted. The doors and windows were repainted, and the orange railings replaced the old green and blue railings. A non-slip surface had been added to areas of the floor and all of the stairways. Extensive CCTV was installed throughout and signage was changed to London Overground standards, as at other Overground stations. The alleyway linking the entrance of the station to Kingsfield Road was upgraded, replacing the repeatedly vandalised wooden fences with metal palisade. The level access from Platform 1 to the Kingsfield Road footpath was closed permanently. The bicycle shed was moved from the front of the station on Pinner Road to the Eastbury Road entrance. The space at the front was converted to a shop and newsagents which is soon to be made into a WHSmith.

Services

Bushey is located on both the London Overground Watford DC line and the West Coast Main Line. Services at the station are operated by both London Overground and London Northwestern Railway. Off-peak services at the station in trains per hour are:

London Overground
 4 tph to 
 4 tph to 
These services are operated by Class 378 and Class 710 EMUs.

London Northwestern Railway 
 2 tph to 
 2 tph to 
These services are usually operated by Class 350 or Class 319 (peak times only) EMUs.

Connections
London Bus routes 142, 258, London Service Permit route 8 also serve the station and non-London Bus Routes 306, 306B, 602 and W19 serve the station.

References

External links

Railway stations in Watford
DfT Category E stations
Proposed London Underground stations
Former London and North Western Railway stations
Railway stations in Great Britain opened in 1841
Railway stations served by West Midlands Trains
Railway stations served by London Overground
1841 establishments in England
Stations on the West Coast Main Line